Ramón Angel María Hicks Cáceres (born 30 May 1959) is a Paraguayan former football winger. A well travelled player at club level he turned out for teams in his homeland (Club Libertad), Uruguay (Nacional), Spain (CE Sabadell FC, Real Oviedo and Elche CF), Argentina (Independiente) and Bolivia (Club San José). He appeared as an international for Paraguay and was in the squad for the 1986 FIFA World Cup. Altogether he made 37 appearances for the national team, scoring six goals.

References

External links

rsssf

1959 births
Sportspeople from Asunción
Paraguayan footballers
Paraguayan expatriate footballers
CE Sabadell FC footballers
Club Libertad footballers
Elche CF players
1986 FIFA World Cup players
Paraguay international footballers
Real Oviedo players
Club Atlético Independiente footballers
Expatriate footballers in Argentina
Expatriate footballers in Spain
Paraguayan expatriate sportspeople in Argentina
Expatriate footballers in Uruguay
Paraguayan expatriate sportspeople in Spain
Expatriate footballers in Bolivia
Club San José players
Club Nacional de Football players
Paraguayan expatriate sportspeople in Bolivia
Paraguayan expatriate sportspeople in Uruguay
1987 Copa América players
Living people
Association football forwards
Paraguayan people of English descent